Christian Klingberg (16 December 1765 – 9 February 1821) was a Danish Supreme Court attorney  and chief legal officer of the Danish Asiatic Company.

Early life and education
Klingberg was born on 16 December 1765 in Copenhagen, the son of lottery inspector-general  Jacob Klingberg (1719–82) and Karen Lund (1733–1806). He graduated from Frederiksborg Latin School in 1783 and passed his legal exams (cand.jur.) at the University of Copenhagen in 1787.

Career
 
He was a lawyer at the Hof- og Stadsret from 1791 and became a Supreme Court Attorney  in 1792. He was in addition chief legal officer of the Danish Asia Company 1812–19 and briefly served as director of the Bank of Denmark in 1818. In 1813, he was designated as Supreme Court justice but never used this appointment.

Klingberg was recognized as one of the leading lawyers of his time and acted as defense attorney in a number of high-profile cases, for instance for  Conrad Malte-Brun.

Personal life
Klingberg married Lovise Elisabeth Klingberg (20 February 1772 – 13 February 1855), a daughter of Lauritz Klongberg (1728–95) and Catharina Elisabeth Schumacher (1745–92), on 28 May 1796 in the Holmen Church.

Klingberg died on 9 February 1821 in Copenhagen and is buried at Valsølille Cemetery.

References

External links

18th-century Danish lawyers
19th-century Danish lawyers
Governors of the Bank of Denmark
Danish Asiatic Company people
People from Copenhagen
University of Copenhagen alumni
1765 births
1821 deaths